Meng Meiqi (born October 15, 1998), is a Chinese singer and actress currently active in China since 2018, signed under Starship Entertainment and Yuehua Entertainment. She was a member of South Korean-Chinese girl group WJSN from 2016 to 2023. After finishing first in the Chinese edition of the survival show Produce 101, she became a member of the Chinese girl group Rocket Girls 101.

Early life
Meng was born on October 15, 1998, in Luoyang, Henan, China.

Meng studied in Luoyang Foreign Language School's Junior High department. She subsequently went to South Korea to become a trainee when she was 15 years old.

Career

2016–2017: Debut with WJSN and acting debut

In December 2015, Starship Entertainment began to release information about a girl group consisting of four units as a collaboration with Chinese entertainment company, Yuehua Entertainment. Meng, alongside the other members of the group's lineup, released a cover of "All I Want For Christmas Is You" by Mariah Carey on December 21. She debuted in WJSN on February 25, 2016, with their first mini-album, Would You Like?. On December 21, she sang the theme song of a movie, Tohoku is spoken all over the world, with Wu Xin and Ma Li.

Meng made her acting debut in 2017 in the film Autumn In My Heart. She was later cast in film Marna alongside WJSN member Wu Xuanyi, Nine Percent and NEX7 member Zhu Zhengting, and UNIQ member Zhou Yixuan.

2018: Produce 101, debut and Rocket Girls controversy

Due to their participation on the show, they withdrew from the remaining promotions for WJSN's fourth mini album Dream Your Dream. Both Meng and Wu made it into the final line-up of girl group Rocket Girls on June 23, 2018. She ranked first with over 185 million votes, debuting as the "Center" for Rocket Girls. However, due to the group's two year contracts with Tencent, it was rumored that Meng and Wu would not be participating in any activities in South Korea with WJSN. Starship Entertainment then stated otherwise, and confirmed that they would be promoting with both WJSN and Rocket Girls.

On August 9, 2018, Yuehua Entertainment and Mavericks Entertainment released a joint announcement stating that they would be withdrawing Meng along with Wu and Zhang Zining from Rocket Girls. Meng and Wu were to resume their activities with WJSN. However, on August 17, both companies confirmed that after coming to an agreement with Tencent, that Meng Meiqi  would be returning to Rocket Girls with Wu Xuanyi and Zhang Zining.

2019–present: Solo debut, and departure from WJSN 
On January 15, 2019, Meng released her first promotional track titled "有种 (Helios)" for the movie, The Wandering Earth. Later in the year, she also released her first extended play,犟 (Jiang), on April 23, 2019, with a lead single under the same title. Within the first twenty minutes of the album's release, it became the fastest selling digital album on QQ Music in 2019 with over 1 million digital sales.

Meng also appeared in the spin-off film of the Step Up franchise, Step Up: Year of the Dance, as the first lead actress. She was also cast as one of the leading actresses for the fantasy film, Jade Dynasty, which was an adaptation from the xianxia novel, Zhu Xian. The movie premiered on September 12.

On October 30, 2020, Meng released a lead single "Mute" for her second EP "Love Not Love (爱·不爱)". The MV for "Mute" was released on November 26, 2020. The second song from the album "Miss You" was released on November 28, 2020, and the last song "Quit" on December 26, 2020.

Meng Meiqi's third EP "岐义双瞳" was released on October 15, 2021.

On November 7, 2022, Meng released her fourth EP 空白频率 (White Frequency). Meng accompanied the release with a dance music video for the EP’s lead single, "Alien".

On March 3, 2023, Starship Entertainment announced that Meng had departed from WJSN after her contract expired.

Discography

Extended plays

Singles

Filmography

Films

Television shows

Notes

References

External links

 
 

1998 births
Living people
Chinese K-pop singers
Korean-language singers of China
People from Taizhou, Zhejiang
Starship Entertainment artists
Singers from Henan
Chinese expatriates in South Korea
Cosmic Girls members
Chinese Mandopop singers
Produce 101 (Chinese TV series) contestants
Rocket Girls 101 members
21st-century Chinese women singers